Beauvais is a railway station located in Beauvais in the Oise department, France. TER Hauts-de-France trains connect the station to Le Tréport-Mers, Creil and Paris-Nord. The Neo-medieval station building was constructed by Compagnie du Nord in brick and concrete in 1860. The line to Paris is electrified with an alternating current running 25 kV-50 Hz. Other lines run with diesel.

History

A station was opened at Beauvais in 1857, when the line Beauvais - Creil was opened. At the time, it took three and a half hours to reach Paris via Creil. The direct line from Paris to Beauvais and further to Le Tréport was opened in 1877. Until 1939, Beauvais was also connected by rail with Gournay-Ferrières, Gisors, Clermont, Saint-Just-en-Chaussée and Amiens (via the Beauvais-Amiens railway).

See also
List of SNCF stations in Hauts-de-France

References

Railway stations in Oise
Railway stations in France opened in 1857
Gare de Beauvais